Chris Joseph Columbus (born September 10, 1958) is an American filmmaker. Born in Spangler, Pennsylvania, Columbus studied film at Tisch School of the Arts where he developed an interest in filmmaking. After writing screenplays for several teen comedies in the mid-1980s, he made his directorial debut with a teen adventure, Adventures in Babysitting (1987). Columbus gained recognition soon after with the highly successful Christmas comedy Home Alone (1990) and its sequel Home Alone 2: Lost in New York (1992).

The comedy Mrs. Doubtfire (1993), starring Robin Williams, was another box office success for Columbus. He went on to direct several other films throughout the 1990s, which were mostly met with lukewarm reception. However, he found commercial success again for directing the film adaptations of J. K. Rowling's novels, Harry Potter and the Sorcerer's Stone (2001) and its sequel, Harry Potter and the Chamber of Secrets (2002), which are his highest-grossing films to date. In addition to directing, Columbus was a producer for Harry Potter and the Prisoner of Azkaban (2004), and the drama The Help (2011). He also directed the fantasy Percy Jackson & the Olympians: The Lightning Thief (2010) and the 3D action comedy Pixels (2015).

Columbus is the co-founder of 1492 Pictures, a film production company that has produced some of his films since 1995. More recently, he co-founded another production firm with his daughter in 2014, called Maiden Voyage Pictures. In 2017, he launched ZAG Animation Studios, alongside Michael Barnathan, Haim Saban, and Jeremy Zag.

Early life
Columbus was born in Spangler, Pennsylvania, and raised in Champion, Ohio, the only child born to Mary Irene (née Puskar), a factory worker, and Alex Michael Columbus, an aluminum plant worker and coal miner. He is of Italian and Czech descent. As a child, he enjoyed drawing storyboards and began making 8mm films in high school.

After graduating from John F. Kennedy High School in Warren, Ohio, he went on to study at New York University's film school at the Tisch School of the Arts, where he was a schoolmate of screenwriter Charlie Kaufman and Alec Baldwin. Although he received a scholarship, he forgot to renew it and was forced to take a factory job to pay for schooling. While on shifts, he secretly worked on a 20-page screenplay, which one of his teachers would later use to help him get an agent. Columbus now states that the experience "saved my life" and he was able to acknowledge "the terrifying reality I faced of having to live and work in that factory for the rest of my life in that town if I didn't make it".

In 1980, while at NYU, Columbus directed a short film entitled I Think I'm Gonna Like It Here that was later noticed by Steven Spielberg. I Think I'm Gonna Like It Here was preserved by the Academy Film Archive in 2014.

Film career

1984–1990: Early success 
Columbus' professional career began in the early 1980s, as a writer for the screenplay of Reckless (1984). Columbus later said, "it wasn't my best work. I intended it to be semi-biographical ... and the film was based on my attempts to break free. But the director turned it into a clumsy teen sex drama and the experience was so degrading." Dissatisfied, Columbus conceived a new screenplay whilst living in an apartment loft, a comedy-horror titled Gremlins (1984). In late 1981, he eventually received a phone call from Steven Spielberg who expressed an interest buying the script. Upon release, the film was a critical success. Columbus then moved to Los Angeles to work for Spielberg's Amblin Entertainment, writing more scripts including The Goonies and Young Sherlock Holmes (both 1985).

After staying in Los Angeles for two years, he said, "There's an unreality to the place, a lack of connection with real people." He decided to move back to New York City. He wrote episodes for the animated series Galaxy High (1986) and received screenwriting credit for Little Nemo: Adventures in Slumberland (1989). Columbus then started his directing career with the teen comedy Adventures in Babysitting (1987). The film received mixed reviews from critics and was regarded as a "mediocre debut". Next, he wrote and directed Heartbreak Hotel (1988) which is a story about Elvis Presley being kidnapped and finding himself offering counsel and help to a small-town family. The film was a commercial failure at the box office and it also received mixed-to-negative reviews.

In the late 1980s, fellow filmmaker John Hughes approached Columbus to direct Home Alone (1990), a comedy film written by Hughes, where eight-year old Kevin McCallister must defend his home from two burglars. Columbus had left National Lampoon's Christmas Vacation before shooting started, because of a personality clash with actor Chevy Chase, who Columbus said treated him "like dirt". Columbus particularly enjoyed the Christmas theme of the Home Alone script and quickly accepted the offer. Subsequently, Columbus hired Macaulay Culkin, Joe Pesci, Daniel Stern, John Heard, and Catherine O'Hara as the principal cast. Filming took four months between February and May 1990 and the film was released to theaters on November 16, 1990, to commercial success. Home Alone grossed $285 million in North America and $190 million elsewhere for a worldwide $476.7 million, against a budget of $18 million. Nominated for two Academy Awards and two Golden Globe Awards, the film served as Culkin's breakthrough role. Dave Kehr of Chicago Tribune praised Hughes for writing recognizable characters, and Columbus for direction with "wit and warmth". Home Alone has since been regarded as a "classic" to watch during the holiday season.

1991–2000: Comedies and romances 
In 1991, Columbus wrote and directed the romantic comedy-drama Only the Lonely (1991), with John Hughes serving as co-producer. Starring John Candy, Maureen O'Hara, Ally Sheedy, and Anthony Quinn, the film depicts a Chicago policeman who must balance his loyalty between his mother and a shy funeral home employee, a loose adaptation of Marty. The film managed to garner some favourable reviews despite performing tepidly at the box office. In 1992, Columbus returned to direct a sequel to Home Alone, titled Home Alone 2: Lost in New York. Featuring the same principal cast of its predecessor, the plot takes place one year after the events of the first film. The film follows Kevin McCallister as he accidentally boards the wrong flight to New York City and finds himself confronted by the same two burglars. Home Alone 2: Lost in New York was released on November 20, 1992, to mixed reviews, but strong box office results, grossing $359 million worldwide. Janet Maslin for The New York Times wrote that "Home Alone 2 may be lazily conceived, but it is staged with a sense of occasion and a lot of holiday cheer. The return of Mr. Culkin in this role is irresistible, even if this utterly natural comic actor has been given little new to do. Mr. Pesci and Mr. Stern bring great gusto to their characters' stupidity".

Columbus' next directorial feature was Mrs. Doubtfire (1993), an adaptation of Anne Fine's novel Alias Madame Doubtfire about an unemployed father who disguises himself as a nanny so he can spend time with his children. Starring Robin Williams, Sally Field and Pierce Brosnan, Williams was given creative freedom to improvise his lines, provoking amusement to all of the cast and crew. The film was released by 20th Century Fox in November 1993 to mixed and positive reception. Film review aggregator Rotten Tomatoes gave the film an approval rating of 72%, praising Williams. Roger Ebert calls Williams "a mercurial talent who loves to dart in and out of many different characters and voices", but thought Mrs. Doubtfire "has the values and depth of a sitcom". However, the film performed well at the box office, earning $441.3 million worldwide. The film also won the Academy Award for Best Makeup, Golden Globe Award for Best Actor and Golden Globe Award for Best Picture.

In 1995, Columbus co-founded his own production company, 1492 Pictures, named after the year that Christopher Columbus reached the Americas; a pun on his own name. He then wrote and directed another film, a remake of the French film Neuf mois, titled Nine Months (1995) which was produced by 1492 Pictures. A romantic comedy, Nine Months starred Hugh Grant, Julianne Moore, Tom Arnold, Joan Cusack, Jeff Goldblum, and Robin Williams. The story centers on a man who finds out that his longtime girlfriend is pregnant and has to change his lifestyle. Although the film was criticized for being "mismanaged", it was a commercial success, grossing $138.5 million at the box office. Columbus followed up on this effort with Stepmom (1998), a comedy-drama starring Julia Roberts, Susan Sarandon, and Ed Harris. Writing for the Los Angeles Times, Kenneth Turan praises Roberts and Harris' performances despite the script having a "tiny handful of honest moments". With an estimated budget of $50 million, the film grossed a healthy $159.7 million worldwide. Sarandon also earned a Golden Globe nomination for Best Actress in a Motion Picture Drama.

Columbus reunited with Robin Williams for his next project, 1999's Bicentennial Man. Based on the novel, The Positronic Man by Isaac Asimov and Robert Silverberg, the film tells the story of a robot who becomes human-like and acquires emotions. The supporting cast included Sam Neill, Embeth Davidtz, Wendy Crewson, and Oliver Platt. The film was released on December 17, 1999, and was a commercial failure, grossing $87.4 million from a budget of $100 million. Critical response to the film were mixed, with Ben Falk of the BBC describing it as "the worst kind of movie – one with no direction, no identity, and above all no heart". Peter Stack of San Francisco Chronicle opined of the film, "It's a bit strange, and strained. More syrupy melodrama than comedy [...] doesn't have much of the usual Williams manic antics", but compliments the computer-generated imagery. Bicentennial Man was nominated for the Academy Award for Best Makeup at the 72nd Academy Awards.

2001–2010: Harry Potter and other film series 

After reading J. K. Rowling's 1997 fantasy novel Harry Potter and the Philosopher's Stone, Columbus expressed a strong desire to direct the film adaptation. In 2000, he convinced Warner Bros. to select him as director for it. The film is the first installment of the Harry Potter film series and was written by Steve Kloves and produced by David Heyman. The story follows Harry Potter's first year at Hogwarts School of Witchcraft and Wizardry and his self-discovery as a famous wizard. Columbus relocated to the United Kingdom with his family to focus on directing. Columbus said the casting process was "very intense", but Daniel Radcliffe, Rupert Grint, and Emma Watson were eventually picked for the lead roles. Filming began on September 29, 2000, and lasted for 180 days. The film premiered at the Odeon Leicester Square in London on November 4, 2001, to critical and commercial success, grossing $975.1 million worldwide. The film was praised for its sets, costumes, casting, musical score, cinematography and special effects. In addition, it was nominated for three Academy Awards for Best Original Score, Best Art Direction and Best Costume Design.

In 2002, Columbus returned to direct the second installment, Harry Potter and the Chamber of Secrets (2002), based on Rowling's second novel. Featuring much of the same cast from the first film, the story follows Harry Potter's second year at the school when a chamber is opened unleashing a monster. Producer David Heyman said, "Fortunately, we benefited from the experience of the first film ... [the cast] have maintained their enthusiasm, sense of wonder". Columbus also opted to use more handheld cameras for freedom of movement. The film was released to theaters on November 15, 2002. Harry Potter and the Chamber of Secrets shared similar critical acclaim to the first film, and grossed $879 million worldwide. A. O. Scott of The New York Times observed that the film was long but praised it for the special effects and "thrilling" sequences. At the 2003 BAFTA Awards, the film garnered nominations for Best Production Design, Best Sound, and Best Special Visual Effects.

In 2004, Columbus wrote and produced Christmas with the Kranks, a Christmas comedy based on the 2001 novel Skipping Christmas by John Grisham; the film was a box office success but received mostly negative reviews. In the same year, Columbus returned for the third installment of the Harry Potter series, Harry Potter and the Prisoner of Azkaban. Physically exhausted from the first two films, he decided not to direct but serve as producer alongside Heyman and director Alfonso Cuarón. The film premiered on May 31, 2004, in the United Kingdom to strong critical praise and earned $796.9 million worldwide. After returning to the United States in 2005, Columbus intended to produce a superhero film, Fantastic Four, but due to disagreements with director Tim Story, he was fired. Next, he directed 2005's Rent, a musical drama adapted from the 1996 Broadway musical of the same name. The film, starring six of the original Broadway cast members, depicts the lives of several Bohemians and their struggles living in East Village of New York City from 1989 to 1990. The film had mixed reviews and a poor box office performance.

In 2006, Columbus served as a producer for Night at the Museum, a fantasy film based on the 1993 children's book of the same name by illustrator Milan Trenc, and is the first installment in the Night at the Museum series. The film stars Ben Stiller as Larry Daley, a father who applies for a job at the American Museum of Natural History and subsequently discovers that the exhibits come to life at night. Next, he served as an executive producer for Fantastic Four: Rise of the Silver Surfer (2007), a sequel to the first film which was also a commercial success. In 2009, he produced Night at the Museum: Battle of the Smithsonian, the second installment of the series. Despite mixed reviews, the film was a box office success, earning $413.1 million worldwide. That same year, he directed I Love You, Beth Cooper, a comedy starring Hayden Panettiere and Paul Rust, based on a novel by Larry Doyle. The film was released in July 2009 to negative reviews; Peter Travers of Rolling Stone wrote that Columbus "flattens every joke and sucks the life out of the actors", adding it is "super bad".

Despite this setback, Columbus was hired by 20th Century Fox to direct Percy Jackson & the Olympians: The Lightning Thief (2010) in which he also produced. The film is the first installment in the Percy Jackson series and is based on fantasy Greek mythology: the 2005 novel The Lightning Thief by Rick Riordan. Starring an ensemble led by Logan Lerman, the film received mixed reviews (and was panned by fans of the original series) but found box office success upon its release in February. The film grossed $226.4 million worldwide. Kenneth Turan of the Los Angeles Times described it as "unadventurous and uninteresting" and criticized screenwriter Craig Titley for changing the original story. The Toronto Stars Linda Barnard praised Columbus' ability to "woo a young audience" but thought the film lacked Harry Potter charm.

2011–present: Focus as a producer and Pixels 
As early as 2009, Variety magazine reported that Columbus, Michael Barnathan, and Mark Radcliffe were working on a film adaptation of Kathryn Stockett's novel The Help. Released in 2011, the film of the same name was directed by Tate Taylor with Columbus serving as producer. The film and novel recount the story of a young white aspiring journalist, Eugenia "Skeeter" Phelan, and her relationship with two black maids, Aibileen Clark and Minny Jackson, during the Civil Rights Movement. The film received critical and commercial success, earning $216.6 million worldwide. Roger Ebert described it as "involving and wonderfully acted", and Amy Biancolli of the San Francisco Chronicle called it "a film that makes us root for the good guys, hiss at the bad and convulse in laughter when good wreaks vengeance with a smile". At the 84th Academy Awards, Octavia Spencer won the Academy Award for Best Supporting Actress for her role. The film also received three other nominations: Best Picture, Best Actress and Best Supporting Actress. The film won the Screen Actors Guild Award for Outstanding Performance by a Cast in a Motion Picture.In 2013, Columbus co-authored the House of Secrets book series with Ned Vizzini. Shortly, Columbus returned to the Percy Jackson series, as an executive producer for the sequel titled Percy Jackson: Sea of Monsters. Directed by Thor Freudenthal, and starring much of the cast from the previous installment, the film grossed $200.9 million worldwide. However, it received a divided critical reaction. Columbus next produced Night at the Museum: Secret of the Tomb, the final installment in the Night at the Museum series. Released in December 2014, the film was a financial success, grossing $363.2 million at the box office. It was also Robin Williams' final film appearance before his death.

In 2014, Columbus cofounded production company Maiden Voyage Pictures with his daughter, Eleanor. He also co-founded an animation studio called ZAG Animation Studios with Saban Capital Group and ZAG Entertainment.

Columbus directed the science fiction comedy, Pixels (2015). He first learned about the project from Adam Sandler; Columbus said "he gave me the Pixels script after we hit it off. My daughter read it and said, ‘You have to read this movie. It’s completely fun and unexpected'". The film is based on Patrick Jean's 2010 short film of the same name, which depicts aliens who attack the Earth in the form of arcade video games. Principal photography took three months in Toronto, after which computer-generated imagery and visual effects were then applied. Starring Sandler, Kevin James, Michelle Monaghan, Peter Dinklage, Josh Gad and Brian Cox, Pixels was met with mixed reviews but earned $244.9 million at the box office. Marjorie Baumgarten of The Austin Chronicle said the film is "flat-footed and grows tedious after the first hour" but praised the 3D effects which "enhances the action". Peter Travers of Rolling Stone gave the film one star out of four, calling it "a 3D metaphor for Hollywood's digital assault on our eyes and brains [...] relentless and exhausting".

Also in 2015, Columbus served as a producer for three films: supernatural horror The Witch, Italian drama Mediterranea and a comedy titled It Had To Be You. During 2016, Columbus produced small-scale and independent features. First, The Young Messiah, a fictional story of a seven-year-old Jesus, who tries to discover the truth about his life when he returns to Nazareth from Egypt. Second, Tallulah, a comedy drama starring Elliot Page, Allison Janney, and Tammy Blanchard; the film is about a young woman who takes a baby from its negligent mother and pretends the child is her own. Tallulah premiered at the Sundance Film Festival on January 23, 2016 and was released on Netflix on July 29, 2016. In 2017, Columbus served as an executive producer for Menashe, and a producer for Patti Cake$ and I Kill Giants. Columbus also produced The Christmas Chronicles (2018), a family film directed by Clay Kaytis. In 2019, Columbus joined the producers of The Lighthouse, a film directed by Robert Eggers and stars Willem Dafoe and Robert Pattinson as two lighthouse keepers who lose their sanity. In 2018 it was announced that Columbus will serve as an executive producer for Scoob!, an animated adventure film featuring characters from the Scooby-Doo franchise. It was released on May 15, 2020. He has also directed The Christmas Chronicles 2, a sequel to the film he had co-produced.

Upcoming projects 
Columbus has been attached as a director to upcoming films; a Hello Ghost remake was announced in 2011, while Melody and a Five Nights at Freddy's film adaptation were both announced in 2015. However, as of September 29, 2021, Columbus has officially backed out of his involvement of the Five Nights at Freddy's film. Speaking to Slashfilm in 2017, Columbus said he has written a script for Gremlins 3 which is currently in development.

Filmmaking style 
Columbus' films are often grounded in stories about unconventional families and explore characters who lose their loved ones. He is regarded as a "sentimental" filmmaker due to his exploration of contemporary domesticity. "One of the themes I've always been fascinated by is a character facing the potential of losing their family and what that means," Columbus said in 2017. Columbus is also known for creating "emotionally vivid scenes", and admits that he is drawn to extreme emotions.

Burhan Wazir of The Guardian states that Columbus prefers characters that are the "everyday American men, women, and children who struggle to uphold family traditions against a changing, sometimes intimidating society". In 1993, Columbus said: "I can understand the validity of showing people the ugliness of the world, but I also think there is a place for movies to leave people with a sense of hope. If your film isn't going to do that, I just don't think it's worth making". Culture website, The Take, opined that Columbus excels in creating family-oriented films but lacks a "distinct cinematic style to his work".

Personal life
Columbus married choreographer Monica Devereux in 1983. The couple have four children named Eleanor, Violet, Brendan, and Isabella. Eleanor had a non-speaking role as Susan Bones in the first two Harry Potter films which her father directed. The family reside in San Francisco. Columbus endorsed Democratic candidate Hillary Clinton in the 2016 United States presidential election. He is also a partner at Ocean Blue Entertainment, a creative content company focused on film production.

Filmography

Critical reception
Below are the average ratings of Columbus's films provided by two review aggregator websites.
{| class="wikitable"
|+
|-
!Year
! Film
! Rotten Tomatoes 
! Metacritic 
|-
|1987
| Adventures in Babysitting || 69% || N/A 
|-
|1988
| Heartbreak Hotel || 38%|| N/A
|-
|1990
| Home Alone || 67% || 63% 
|-
|1991
|Only the Lonely
|64%
|N/A
|-
|1992
| Home Alone 2: Lost in New York || 34% || N/A
|-
|1993
| Mrs. Doubtfire || 71% || 53% 
|-
|1995
| Nine Months || 23% || N/A
|-
|1998
| Stepmom || 46% || 58%
|-
|1999
| Bicentennial Man || 36% || 42%
|-
|2001
| Harry Potter and the Sorcerer's Stone || 81%|| 64%
|-
|2002
| Harry Potter and the Chamber of Secrets || 82%<ref>{{cite web |url=https://www.rottentomatoes.com/m/harry_potter_and_the_chamber_of_secrets/ |title=Rotten Tomatoes T-Meter Rating of Harry Potter and the Chamber of Secrets' |website=Rotten Tomatoes |access-date=December 3, 2019 |archive-url=https://web.archive.org/web/20131123002500/http://www.rottentomatoes.com/m/harry_potter_and_the_chamber_of_secrets/ |archive-date=November 23, 2013 |url-status=live }}</ref> || 63%
|-
|2005
| Rent || 46% || 53% 
|-
|2009
| I Love You, Beth Cooper || 13% || 32%
|-
|2010
| Percy Jackson & the Olympians: The Lightning Thief || 49% || 47%
|-
|2015
| Pixels || 17% || 27%
|-
|2020
| The Christmas Chronicles 2 || 67% || 51%
|}

 See also 
 Chris Columbus's unrealized projects

References

External links

BBC Movies article about Chris Columbus
Chris Columbus biography from The New York Times''

1958 births
Living people
American people of Italian descent
American film producers
American male screenwriters
American people of Czech descent
Comedy film directors
Fantasy film directors
Film directors from Pennsylvania
Film directors from San Francisco
Film directors from Ohio
People from Cambria County, Pennsylvania
People from Warren, Ohio
Screenwriters from California
Screenwriters from Ohio
Screenwriters from Pennsylvania
Tisch School of the Arts alumni
Writers from San Francisco
Writers from Youngstown, Ohio